A Keipi or festivity supra is a traditional banquet feast in Georgia.

History 
In ancient Georgia, a keipi would be held in the spring for all the village to attend. The women of the village would ensure that the food was constantly replenished as a tamada, or toastmaster, gives a toast. Tradition would have that no one could touch their wine bowl until the toast was finished.

Rules and habits 
In his book, Vintage: The Story of Wine, Hugh Johnson notes that at some keipi there may be 20 or more toasts, with spaces between to ensure that no one gets overly intoxicated since the constant threat of invasion called for everyone in the village to be sober enough to fight. He goes on to mention that "The Georgian custom is to drain the wine bowl, then throw away the last drops. They are the number of your enemies."  

A tamada arranges breaks from time to time. The thing is that there are special toasts which according to the ritual should be accompanied by a song or a verse. Almost everyone in Georgia has a good ear to music and good voice. Songs have always accompanied the Georgians in joy and sorrow, in battle and labor. Old Georgian drinking−songs are melodious, polyphonic and rather complicated. Some of them don't need any accompaniment. The choir of men creates musical background. Modern drinking−songs are usually performed to the accompaniment of the guitar or the piano. Special drinking songs and wedding songs (if it is a wedding party) as well as chants full of humor, sung by guests during the course of the party contest. It may sound strange but sometimes even events of social, economic and political significance are discussed during the table talks, and some problems are solved peacefully. The atmosphere at the Georgian table is so friendly and candid that even the enemies are likely to make up.

If there is enough room at the party you may take part in folk dances. In these dances and at the table men ought to be gentlemen and try to be very polite and respect the ladies. Of course, no songs and dances accepted at “khelehi” (funeral banquets).

Footnotes

Further reading 
Darra Goldstein (1999), The Georgian Feast: The Vibrant Culture and Savory Food of the Republic of Georgia. University of California Press, .

See also 
traditional Georgian feast - Supra
Georgian burial banquet - Kelekhi

External links 
GEORGIA TRAVEL, Wine drinking, tradition in Georgia
 Georgia: society, language and culture Georgian traditions;

Culture of Georgia (country)
Georgian words and phrases